Wickland may refer to:

Places
Wickland (Bardstown, Kentucky), USA, built 1815
Wickland (Shelbyville, Kentucky), USA, built 1901

People
Al Wickland, an outfielder in Major League Baseball
Carl Wickland, a paranormal researcher